Parmigiani Fleurier SA is a Swiss brand of luxury watchmakers founded in 1996 in Fleurier, Switzerland, by Michel Parmigiani. In 2006, Parmigiani produced the Bugatti 370, a driving watch which won the 2006 "Watch of the Year Award" from the Japanese press, supposedly based on the Bugatti Veyron supercar.

The company is owned by the Sandoz Family Foundation. Guido Terreni is the CEO of the company since January 2021.

History
Parmigiani Fleurier was started in 1996 in Val-de-Travers. Founder Michel Parmigiani had conceived the brand as far back as 1976 through his work restoring watchmaking artifacts and his detailed knowledge of historical mechanical clocks and watches. The Parmigiani restoration workshop worked with the Sandoz family to restore the collection of the Room Maurice Yves Sandoz of the Musée d’Horlogerie du Locle, which eventually led to the creation of the Parmigiani Fleurier company owned by the Sandoz Foundation.

In 2016, Parmigiani Fleurier unveiled the Hippologia, a 55kg, oval-shaped table clock covered in a foil of white gold and elaborated with the French glassmaker Lalique. In December 2020, Parmigiani Fleurier inked a partnership with Giorgio Armani to create the Giorgio Armani Fine Watches collection which was supposed to be launched by the end of 2021. In January 2021, Guido Terrni replaced Davide Traxler as CEO of the company.

Watches
Parmigiani carries a men's line of watches, and a line that caters specifically to women. All Parmigiani Fleurier watches are hand-made, taking at least four hundred hours to put together; they are constructed with only precious metals and precious or semi-precious stones. In order to create exclusivity, only a few thousand pieces are produced every year. Their watch lines include the Toric, Forma (renamed Kalpa) and the single watch, the Bugatti 370.

In 2006, the Bugatti 370 was awarded the "Watch of the Year" award by the Japanese Press. The watch is a driving watch based on the Bugatti Veyron supercar. It is designed to look like a transversal engine, and is mounted in 18 carat gold. In order to make it readable while driving, the face of the watch has been placed in a vertical position on the case's front. The first Bugatti watch was given to car enthusiast Ralph Lauren. Only one hundred and fifty of the watches will be made each year, fifty of each of the three dial colors available. The watch will cost USD$200,000. In 2009, Parmigiani Fleurier and Pershing, the Italian Yacht Company announced that they will be offering the first ever line of Pershing Aquatic sport watches.  The watch will be available in two different lines - the limited edition one-one-five, and the Pershing Chronographs collection. The watch is available with a rubber strap or steel bracelet, and is water resistant up to 200 metres.

Senfine concept

In 2016, Parmigiani-Fleurier presents the Senfine concept housing a new escapement taking advantage of the properties of silicon flat springs. The revolutionary concept uses an oscillator with high frequency and low amplitude for enhanced precision and power reserve.

See also
List of watch manufactures

References

External links
An interview with founder Michel Parmigiani
Evolution of the escapement, Monochrome-watches, Xavier Markl, February 2016

Watch manufacturing companies of Switzerland
Swiss watch brands
Design companies established in 1975
Manufacturing companies established in 1975
Swiss companies established in 1975
Privately held companies of Switzerland
Companies based in the canton of Neuchâtel